The RPI Engineers women's ice hockey team are a National Collegiate Athletic Association (NCAA) Division I women's college ice hockey program that represents Rensselaer Polytechnic Institute (RPI). The Engineers are a member of the ECAC Hockey (ECACHL) conference. They play at the Houston Field House in Troy, New York.

History
The Engineers women's hockey program began for the 1995–96 season, playing at the NCAA Division III level in ECAC East. In their final season in Division III, the 2004–05 season, the Engineers qualified to the championship game of the ECAC East Tournament. It was their second consecutive season in the championship. That season, RPI had 21 wins, compared to only 6 losses and a league record of 17–2–0. In addition, the Engineers were ranked second in the nation in scoring defense (allowing only 1.22 goals per game). Nationally, the Engineers were fourth in power play percentage and eighth in scoring offense. The star of the team was sophomore Julie Aho. She was selected as an AHCA National All-America, and led the team in scoring in each of her first two seasons.

In 2005–06, RPI was a Division I independent. The club won 18 games, lost 6 and tied 2. During that season, the team notched wins over Colgate, Northeastern, Connecticut and Boston University. Despite being an independent, the Engineers were ranked fourth in the NCAA in winning percentage (.731) and seventh in scoring offense (3.23 goals per game average). Senior goaltender Rosina Schiff would become the program's all-time leader in wins with 40 (since broken) and games played with 65 (since broken).

Rensselaer joined the ECAC for the 2006–07 season. In its second season in the ECAC (2007–08), Rensselaer won 13 games, compared to 15 losses and 5 ties and a conference record of 6–12–4. The Engineers matched the single season record for ties, including its first-ever point over then nationally ranked Dartmouth in a 1–1 draw in Hanover.

The record for most wins at the NCAA Division I level in one season is 19, which was set in 2008–09 (19–14–4). The overall program record is 21, set in 2004–05, the team's last year at the Division III level. The Engineers made NCAA history on February 28, 2010, beating Quinnipiac 2–1 in five overtime periods. Senior defenseman Laura Gersten had the game-winning goal. She registered it at 4:32 of the fifth overtime session to not only clinch the win, but the series victory. It is now the second longest college hockey game in NCAA history, surpassed a few weeks later on March 12, 2010, in a men's hockey contest between Quinnipiac beat Union.

During the 2010–11 season, the Engineers boasted one statistic that no other Division I team in the country could: three Alaskan players on its current roster. Amanda Castignetti is from Anchorage (and attended Shattuck St-Mary's in Minnesota), Jordan Smelker, a freshman from Anchorage, and Nona Letuligasenoa (attended the North American Hockey Academy in Stowe, Vermont) were the three players in question.

Engineers in Pro Hockey
As of autumn 2016, there were six Engineers alumnae who had competed in professional women's ice hockey. The list of players includes Whitey Naslund (Class of 2010), Sonja van der Bliek (Class of 2011), Andie LeDonne (Class of 2013), Delaney Middlebrook and Jordan Smelker (Class of 2015) and Alexa Gruschow (Class of 2016).

Naslund would play for the CWHL's Boston Blades under head coach Digit Murphy, capturing a Clarkson Cup championship in 2013. LeDonne and van der Bliek also competed in the CWHL, with van der Bliek taking on goaltender roles with the Brampton Thunder and Toronto Furies. Middlebrook would compete with Riksserien in the Swedish Elite League.

Both Isobel Cup champions, Smelker was a member of the Boston Pride roster that captured the NWHL's inaugural championship in 2016. As a side note, Smelker also won a Clarkson Cup in 2015 with the CWHL's Boston Blades. Winning the NWHL regular season scoring title in 2018, Gruschow was MVP of the Isobel Cup Finals in the same year, hoisting the Cup with the Metropolitan Riveters.

Year by year

{| class="wikitable"
|bgcolor="#ffeeaa"|Won Championship
|bgcolor="#ddffdd"|<small>'Lost Championship</small>
|bgcolor="#d0e7ff"|Conference Champions
|bgcolor="#ffbbbb"|League Leader
|}
After transitioning the program to the Division I level, Burke served as head coach for 11 more seasons before being fired in June, 2017. Bryan Vines was named interim head coach later that month and took the helm beginning with the 2017–18 season. Prior to the 2005–06 season, the Engineers were in NCAA Division III''.

Players

2022–23 roster
As of September 6, 2022.

Notable players 

 Ena Nystrøm (G), 2019–2020
 Lovisa Selander (G), 2015–2019
 Jordan Smelker (F), 2010–2014
 Sonja van der Bliek (G), 2007–2011
 Alison Wright (F), 2006–2010

As of the end of the 2009–10 season, Sonja van der Bliek was RPI's single season record holder in numerous categories: most games played (84), most games started (83), most wins (42–31–11), most minutes played (5161:36), most saves (1922) and most shutouts (16). In the 2017–18 season, junior goaltender Lovisa Selander overtook van der Bliek as the all-time leader in career saves. She enters her senior season in 2018–19 with 2,935 career stops.

Awards and honors
 Julie Aho, AHCA National All-America (2005)
 Laura Gersten, Sarah Devens Award
 Alisa Harrison, ECAC Hockey All-Rookie Team (2009)
 Whitney Naslund, ECAC Hockey Championship All-Tournament Team (2009)
 Sierra Vadner, Defense, 2009 ECAC All-Rookie Team
 Sonja van der Bliek was named the ECAC Goaltender of the Week (for the week of March 1, 2010) 
 Sarah Daniel, 2 time Academic All American and two-time captain, 2006, 2007
 Lovisa Selander, ECAC Rookie of the Year & Goalie of the Year Finalist, ECAC Third Team All-Conference, ECAC All-Rookie Team (2015–16), All-ECAC Hockey Preseason Team (2016–17), ECAC Hockey Second Team All-Conference (2017–18), ECAC Hockey Pre-Season Team, ECAC Goaltender of the Year, ECAC First Team All-Conference, CCM Hockey/AHCA Division I First Team All-America, Top-10 Patty Kazmaier Award Nominee, NCAA All-Time Division I Women's Hockey career saves record holder (4,167) (2018–19).

Engineers in professional hockey

See also 
 RPI Engineers men's ice hockey

References

External links 
RPI Women's Ice Hockey

 
Ice hockey teams in New York (state)